Corey Phillip Paris is an American politician serving as a member of the Connecticut House of Representatives from the 145th district. Elected in an April 29, 2021 special election, he assumed office on May 4, 2021.

Early life and education 
Paris was born in Little Rock, Arkansas and raised by his grandparents in Kansas City, Kansas. He earned a Bachelor of Science degree from Western Connecticut State University and a Master of Public Administration from the University of New Haven.

Career 
Paris was the president of the Connecticut Young Democrats. He also worked for People for the American Way. He was elected to the Connecticut House of Representatives on April 27, 2021, special election with 76% of the vote, and assumed office on May 4, 2021. During his first term in the legislature, Paris was appointed to serve as a member of the Appropriations, Education, and Environmental committees.

References

External links

Living people
Democratic Party members of the Connecticut House of Representatives
African-American state legislators in Connecticut
Politicians from Little Rock, Arkansas
Politicians from Kansas City, Kansas
Western Connecticut State University alumni
University of New Haven alumni
21st-century American politicians
Year of birth missing (living people)
21st-century African-American politicians